Academic grading in Ukraine was changed from the old Soviet system after 2002.

The new system for middle and high school provides grades that lie within 1 and 12 and are matched with the 5-point grade system that was used previously, as presented in the table below. 12 being an equivalent of honors/AP course "A+" in US, is always given only for significant achievements or exceptionally creative work, hence 11 is the grade that would be called A in the United States. The lowest passing grade is 4.

The table above does not reflect the grading systems of all higher education institutions, as some of them are still using the former USSR system.

Ukraine
Grading
Grading